Tunhill Rocks is a collection of granite rocks overlooking the Dartmoor village of Widecombe-in-the-Moor in England. It is close to at least 10 other tors within 2 miles and stands at 369 metres above sea level.

References

Dartmoor